Lucía González Blanco (born 9 July 1990) is a Spanish professional cyclo-cross and road racing cyclist, who currently rides for UCI Women's Continental Team  in road racing, and UCI Cyclo-cross Team Nesta–Škoda Alecar in cyclo-cross. She represented her nation in the women's elite event at the 2016 UCI Cyclo-cross World Championships in Heusden-Zolder.

She finished third in the 2013 Spanish National Road Race Championships.

See also
 List of 2015 UCI Women's Teams and riders

References

External links
 

1990 births
Living people
Spanish female cyclists
Place of birth missing (living people)
Cyclo-cross cyclists
Cyclists from Asturias